Karmen Sunčana Lovrić (born March 24, 1986 in Zagreb), is a Croatian actress.

Filmography

Movie roles

References

1986 births
Living people
Croatian actresses